Azerbaijan TV is a regional state run TV station affiliated to IRIB. It covers mostly West Azerbaijan province of Iran.

Sister channels
Sahand TV
Eshragh TV
Sabalan TV
Mahabad TV

See also
List of Persian-language television channels
List of Azerbaijani-language television channels

References

External links

Television stations in Iran
Mass media in Urmia
Azerbaijani-language television stations
Persian-language television stations
Television channels and stations established in 1998